Vedan is a 1993 Indian Tamil-language crime action film directed by Suresh Krissna and produced by Sathya Jyothi Films. The film stars R. Sarathkumar and Khushbu, with Charan Raj, Sarath Babu, Easwari Rao and Radha Ravi in supporting roles. It follows Inspector Vijay as he joins the gang of a notorious criminal, Bhoopathi, under an assumed identity with the sole intention of infiltrating it and also falls in love with his superior officer Ganesh's sister Usha and later witness the slaughter of Ganesh who gave him the task. How Vijay completes the mission even though Bhoopathi has begun to suspect his identity forms the crux of the story. The film was released on 6 May 1993.

Plot 

The film starts with a politician being murdered by the henchman of the local don Boopathy. The police commissioner Ganesh appoints the Scotland Yard trainee Vijay to arrest Boopathy. Vijay finally infiltrates Boopathy's gang under the name Ranjith Kumar as an ex-jailbird. Vijay later arranges to kidnap Boopathy's sister Priya, and he rescues her. Boopathy then starts to like him, and Vijay slowly becomes his right hand. In the meantime, Vijay and the bubbly girl Usha fall in love with each other. Thereafter, Ganesh gets killed, and Vijay has to dismantle Boopathy's gang on its own. In addition to this, Boopathy begins to suspect Vijay to be a mole. What transpires next forms the rest of the story.

Cast 

R. Sarathkumar as  Vijay IPS (Ranjith Kumar)
Khushbu as Usha
Charan Raj as Boopathy
Sarath Babu as Commissioner Ganesh
Easwari Rao as Priya
Radha Ravi as Megharajan
Charle
Chinni Jayanth as Ezhumalai
Janagaraj as McDowell
Kazan Khan as Madhan
Ajay Rathnam as Ajay
Rajesh Kumar as Inspector Bhaskar
Poovilangu Mohan as Mohan
Thalapathi Dinesh as Nathan
Ponnambalam
Kavithalaya Krishnan as Restaurant Waiter
Mohan Raman
Oru Viral Krishna Rao
Lalitha Kumari
Abhilasha
S. N. Parvathy
Shihan Hussaini

Soundtrack 

The music was composed by Deva, with lyrics by Vairamuthu.

Release and reception 
Vedan was released on 6 May 1993. Malini Mannath of The Indian Express called it "lot of gloss and no content; [..] with a very loosely-etched screenplay woven around it." C. R. K. of Kalki wrote .

References

External links 
 

1990s crime action films
1990s Tamil-language films
1993 films
Fictional portrayals of the Tamil Nadu Police
Films directed by Suresh Krissna
Films scored by Deva (composer)
Indian crime action films